Juhari Devi Girls' P.G. College is a college for girls in Kanpur, Uttar Pradesh, India. It is government aided and affiliated to CSJM University Kanpur.

History

This college was established by Padampat Singhania (J.K. Group) in the memory of his maternal grandmother, Juhari Devi in 1963.

Location
It is near Phool Bag Park towards the east and right bank on river Ganga in the heart of Kanpur.

Affiliation
Agra University: 1963
Kanpur University: 1966 (CSJM University Kanpur)

Courses

Government aided
B.A.: Hindi, English, Sanskrit, Psychology, Home Science, Sociology, Education, Economics, Political Science, History, Drawing & Painting, Music Vocal, Music Instrumental (sitar/tabla)
M.A.: Hindi, Sanskrit, Music (Vocal), Music Instrumental (sitar), Drawing & Painting

Self finance
Home Science

References

Women's universities and colleges in Uttar Pradesh
Universities and colleges in Kanpur
Colleges affiliated to Chhatrapati Shahu Ji Maharaj University
Educational institutions established in 1963
1963 establishments in Uttar Pradesh